Spring Dale is an unincorporated community in Fayette County, West Virginia, United States. Spring Dale has a post office with ZIP code 25986.

The community was so named for the springs near the original town site.

References

Unincorporated communities in Fayette County, West Virginia
Unincorporated communities in West Virginia